Prisons in North Korea (often referred to in mainstream media as the "North Korean gulags") have conditions that are unsanitary, life-threatening and are comparable to historical concentration camps. A significant number of inmates have died each year, since they are subject to torture and inhumane treatment. Public and secret executions of inmates, even children, especially in cases of attempted escape, are commonplace. Infanticides (and infant killings upon birth) also often occur. The mortality rate is exceptionally high, because many prisoners die of starvation, illnesses, work accidents, or torture.

During the height of the North Korean famine, the government's response was to set up many low-level labor camps for those who were caught crossing the North Korean-Chinese border or were repatriated from China. These labor training facilities were also used in response to the black market activity that resulted in people searching for food throughout the countryside.

In 2004, these “labor training” facilities were made a regular form of punishment under the new reforms of the criminal code which included a list of economic and social crimes. This list was increased in 2007 with the corresponding punishments growing.

The DPRK government denies all allegations of human rights violations in prison camps, claiming that this is prohibited by criminal procedure law, but former prisoners testify that there are completely different rules in the prison camps. The DPRK government has released no information on inmates or prison camps and has not allowed access to any human rights organizations. According to a North Korean defector, North Korea considered inviting a delegation of the UN Commission on Human Rights to visit the Yodok prison camp in 1996.

Lee Soon-ok gave detailed testimony on her treatment in the North Korean prison system to the United States Senate Committee on the Judiciary in 2002. In her statement she said, "I testify that most of the 6,000 prisoners who were there when I arrived in 1987 had quietly perished under the harsh prison conditions by the time I was released in 1992." Many other former inmates, including Kang Chol-hwan and Shin Dong-hyuk, gave detailed and consistent testimonies on the human rights crimes in North Korean prison camps.

According to the testimony of former camp guard Ahn Myong-chol of Camp 22, the guards are trained to treat the detainees as subhumans. He gave an account of children in one camp who were fighting over corn retrieved from cow dung.

North Korean prison camps are of two types: large internment camps for political prisoners (Kwan-li-so in Korean) and reeducation prison camps (Kyo-hwa-so in Korean).

Internment camps for political prisoners

The internment camps for people who are accused of political offences and people who are accused of being politically unreliable are run by the State Security Department. Reports by refugees also indicate that all religious activities are considered illegal; offenders are frequently arrested and sent to political prison camps. Refugees reported that people were subjected to arrests and disappearances for owning Bibles. Political prisoners were historically subjected to the family responsibility principle, in which the immediate family members of convicted political criminals were also regarded as political criminals and interned. However, since 1994, there has been a near-abandonment of the use of the family responsibility principle.

It has been estimated that a quarter of a million people are still political prisoners, one-third of them are children, and they are routinely forced to perform slave labor, tortured, and raped. According to satellite imagery and the testimonies of defectors, including testimonies by former prison guards, these human rights violations continue unabated.

According to former guards who have defected from North Korea, in the event of the Kim Family Regime's collapse or in the event of another crisis in North Korea, they were ordered to kill all political prisoners. The immediate murder of approximately 120,000 North Korean political prisoners would constitute a genocide.

According to the law which was passed by the North Korean regime, “guilt by association”, a person who is accused of committing a crime and a person who is accused of being politically unreliable and three generations of his or her family members are all sent to the same political prison camp.

The internment camps are located in central and northeastern North Korea. They consist of many prison labour colonies in secluded mountain valleys, completely isolated from the outside world. The total number of prisoners who are incarcerated in the camps is estimated to range from 150,000 to 200,000. Yodok camp and Pukchang camp are separated into two sections: One section for political prisoners who are in lifelong detention, another section which is similar to re-education camps with prisoners who are sentenced to long-term imprisonment which ranges from 5 to 20 years.

The prisoners are forced to perform hard and dangerous slave work with primitive means in mining and agriculture. The food rations are very small, so the prisoners are constantly on the brink of starvation. Along with the hard work, the small food rations cause a huge number of the prisoners to die. It is estimated that 40% of the prisoners die from malnutrition.

Moreover, many prisoners are crippled from work accidents, frostbite or torture. Additionally, a rigid punishment regimen exists in the camps. Prisoners who work too slowly and prisoners who do not obey orders are beaten or tortured. In cases when one prisoner is accused of stealing food or attempting to escape, the other prisoners are publicly executed.

Initially, there were around twelve political prison camps, but some of them were merged or closed (e.g. Onsong prison camp, Kwan-li-so No. 12, following a suppressed riot with around 5,000 dead people in 1987). Today there are six political prison camps in North Korea, with the size determined from satellite images and the number of prisoners estimated by former prisoners and NGOs.
Most of the camps are documented in testimonies of former prisoners and, for all of them, coordinates and satellite images are available.

Repatriation 
During the height of the famine in the mid to late 1990s, thousands of North Koreans crossed the border into China in search of food or jobs to support their families back home. The Chinese government, fearful of the North Korean government's response, repatriated the North Korean refugees back to their country. The North Korean border police often tortured North Koreans who were forcibly repatriated, but at the time, the government stated that the repatriated citizens would be treated fairly. If it was determined that those who fled to China had any contact with South Koreans or Protestant Christian organizations, they were sent to labor colonies or gyohwaso (felony-level penitentiaries).

Camps

Accounts 
The South Korean journalist Kang Chol-hwan is a former prisoner of Yodok Political Prison Camp and has written a book, The Aquariums of Pyongyang, about his time in the camp. The South Korean human rights activist Shin Dong-hyuk is the only person known to have escaped from Kaechon Political Prison Camp. He gave an account of his time in the camp.

Reeducation camps 

The reeducation camps for criminals are run by the Ministry of Social Security. There is a fluent passage between common crimes and political crimes, as people who get on the bad side of influential party members are often denounced on false accusations. They are then forced into false confessions with brutal torture in detention centers (Lee Soon-ok for example had to kneel down whilst being showered with water at icy temperatures with other prisoners, of whom six did not survive) and are then condemned in a brief show trial to a long-term prison sentence.

In North Korea, political crimes are greatly varied, from border crossing to any disturbance of the political order, and they are rigorously punished. Due to the dire prison conditions with hunger and torture, a large percentage of prisoners do not survive their sentence terms.

One account of a North Korean refugee recalls being kicked repeatedly in the stomach by her North Korean guard in an attempt to abort her 5-month-old unborn baby. After losing consciousness during the beatings, she awoke inside the camp's clinic where her baby was forcibly removed.

The reeducation camps are large prison building complexes surrounded by high walls. The situation of prisoners is quite similar to that in the political prison camps. They have to perform slave labour in prison factories and in case they do not meet the work quotas, they are tortured and (at least in Kaechon camp) confined for many days in special prison cells, which are too small for them to stand up or lie full-length in.

To be distinguished from the internment camps for political prisoners, the reeducation camp prisoners are forced to undergo ideological instruction after work and they are also forced to memorize the speeches of Kim Il-sung and Kim Jong-il and they even have to undergo self-criticism rites. Many prisoners are guilty of common crimes which are also penalized in other countries e. g. illegal border crossing, stealing food or illegal trading.

There are around 15 to 25 reeducation camps in North Korea.

Camps 

Kyo-hwa-so Sunghori was closed in 1991 but was later reopened at a new location on an unknown date.

Accounts 
The South Korean human rights activist Lee Soon-ok has written a book (Eyes of the Tailless Animals: Prison Memoirs of a North Korean Woman) about her time in the camp and testified before the US Senate.

TIME magazine article, Running out of Darkness, reports on the efforts of Kim Myong-suk to escape a North Korean prison with the help of a South Korean based charity, Helping Hands Korea.

"Resort" prison

In December 2016, the South China Morning Post reported on the existence of a secret prison in Hyanghari, which is euphemistically known as a 'resort,' where members of the country's political elite are imprisoned.

See also 

 Human rights in North Korea
 List of concentration and internment camps#Democratic People's Republic of Korea
 Crimes against humanity under communist regimes
 Mass killings under communist regimes

References

External links
Committee for Human Rights in North Korea: The Hidden Gulag – Exposing Crimes against Humanity in North Korea's Vast Prison System - Overview of North Korean prison camps with testimonies and satellite photographs
Amnesty International: North Korea: Political Prison Camps - Document on conditions in North Korean prison camps
Freedom House: Concentrations of inhumanity  – Analysis of the phenomena of repression associated with North Korea's political labor camps
National Human Rights Commission of Korea: Survey Report on Political Prisoners’ Camps in North Korea – Overall and systematic analysis of political prison camps on the basis of in-depth interviews with North Korean witnesses
Christian Solidarity Worldwide: North Korea: A case to answer – a call to act – Report to emphasize the urgent need to mass killings, arbitrary imprisonment, torture and related international crimes
 Washington Post: North Koreas Hard Labor Camps - Explore North Korean prison camps with interactive map
 One Free Korea: North Koreas’ Largest Concentration Camps on Google Earth - Satellite imagery and witness accounts of North Korean political prison and reeducation camps
 

 

Penal system in North Korea
Repatriation